Riska Fotballklubb is a Norwegian association football club from Sandnes.

The men's football team currently plays in the Third Division, the fourth tier of Norwegian football. The team was newly promoted for 2015, and in recent times they had sporadic Third Division seasons in 1995, 1996, 2004 and 2010. The team colours are yellow and black.

References

 Official site 

Football clubs in Norway
Sport in Sandnes
Association football clubs established in 1945
1945 establishments in Norway